The Uruguay women's national basketball team is administered by the Federación Uruguaya de Básquetbol - "FUBB".

It competes at the South American Basketball Championship for Women.

See also
 Uruguay women's national under-19 basketball team
 Uruguay women's national under-17 basketball team
 Uruguay women's national 3x3 team

References

External links
Official website
Uruguay at FIBA Americas
Presentation at Latinbasket.com

 
Women's national basketball teams
Women's national basketball teams in South America